This is a list of Romanian football players that have played abroad in professional leagues other than the Romanian League.

Australia

A-League

Lucian Goian (Perth Glory)

Austria

Austrian Bundesliga

Paul Pîrvulescu (SKN St. Pölten)
 
Andrei Ivan (Rapid Wien)

Azerbaijan

Azerbaijan Premier League
Adrian Scarlatache (FK Khazar Lankaran)

Belarus

Belarusian Premier League
Adrian Avrămia (Dinamo Brest)

Belgium

Belgian Pro League
Dorin Rotariu (Club Brugge)
Răzvan Marin (Standard Liège)
Cristian Manea (Royal Mouscron-Péruwelz) (on loan)
Alexandru Chipciu (RSC Anderlecht )
Nicolae Stanciu (RSC Anderlecht )

Bulgaria

Bulgarian A Football Group
Cosmin Moți (PFC Ludogorets Razgrad)
Claudiu Keșerü (PFC Ludogorets Razgrad)
Dragoș Grigore (PFC Ludogorets Razgrad)
Sergiu Homei (Neftochimic Burgas)
Srdjan Luchin (Levski Sofia)

Croatia

Prva HNL
Alexandru Mățel (GNK Dinamo Zagreb)

Cyprus

Cypriot First Division
George Florescu (AC Omonia)
Andrei Enescu (Ethnikos Achna)
Bogdan Gavrilă (Ethnikos Achna)
Andrei Radu (Aris)
Ionuț Neagu (Nea Salamis)
Alexandru Benga (Ermis)
Bogdan Mitrea (AEL Limassol)

Czech Republic

Czech First League
Bogdan Vătăjelu (AC Sparta Prague)
Nicolae Stanciu (AC Sparta Prague)
Andrei Sintean (SK Slavia Prague U21)

Denmark

Danish First Division
David Lazar (Vejle Boldklub)

England

Premier League
Ilie Dumitrescu
Costel Pantilimon (West Bromwich Albion F.C.)
Florin Gardoș (Southampton F.C.)
Vlad Dragomir (Arsenal FC U18)
Alex Dobre (A.F.C. Bournemouth U21)
Marco Dulca (Swansea City A.F.C. Under-23s)
Florin Răducioiu (West Ham United.)
Dan Petrescu (Chelsea, Southampton )
Adrian Mutu (Chelsea)

Football League Championship
 Adrian Popa (Reading FC)
 Dennis Politic (Bolton Wanderers U18)

Football League Two
Shane Cojocărel (Barnet F.C.)

Finland

Kakkonen
 Cristian Pandelescu (JIPPO)

France

Championnat National
Sorin Cucu (Belfort)

Germany

2. Bundesliga
Alexandru Maxim (VfB Stuttgart)
 Ralph Gunesch (FC Ingolstadt 04)
 Ronny Philp (1. FC Heidenheim)
László Sepsi (1. FC Nürnberg)

Regionalliga West
Andreas Ivan (Wuppertaler SV)

Greece

Football League
Lucian Burdujan (Aiginiakos F.C.)

Hungary

Nemzeti Bajnokság I
Loránd Szilágyi (Budapest Honvéd FC)

Nemzeti Bajnokság II

 Lóránd Szatmári (Puskás Akadémia FC)

Israel

Israeli Premier League
Ovidiu Hoban (Hapoel Be'er Sheva F.C.)
Mihai Roman (Maccabi Petah Tikva) (on loan)
 Arik Yanko (Hapoel Ra'anana A.F.C.)

Liga Leumit
Emil Ninu (Hapoel Bnei Lod)

Italy

Serie A
Bogdan Lobonț (A.S. Roma)
Ștefan Radu (S.S. Lazio)
Vlad Chiricheș (SSC Napoli)
Ciprian Tătărușanu (ACF Fiorentina)
Ianis Hagi (ACF Fiorentina)
Ionuț Radu (Inter Milan)
Alexandru Mitriță (Pescara)
Adrian Stoian (F.C. Crotone)

Serie B
Valentin Cojocaru (Frosinone)
Vasile Mogos (Ascoli)
George Pușcaș (Benevento) (on loan)
Constantin Nica (Latina) (on loan)
Deian Boldor (Hellas Verona) (on loan)

Lega Pro
Ionuț Rada (Fidelis Andria)
Sergiu Suciu (Pordenone)
Ștefan Popescu (Modena)

Netherlands

Eredivisie
Andreas Calcan (Willem II)

Poland

Ekstraklasa
Mihai Răduț (Lech Poznań)
Gabriel Matei (GKS Górnik Łęczna)
Cornel Râpă (Pogoń Szczecin)

Portugal

LigaPro
Cristian Ponde (SC Covilhã) (on loan)
Bogdan Chipirliu (Nacional da Madeira)

Qatar

Russia

Russian Football Premier League
Eric Bicfalvi (FC Ural Yekaterinburg)
Gheorghe Grozav (Terek Grozny)
Andrei Prepeliță (FC Rostov)
Alexandru Bourceanu (FC Arsenal Tula)
Gabriel Torje (Terek Grozny)
 Kehinde Fatai (FC Ufa)

Saudi Arabia

Saudi Professional League
Lucian Sânmărtean (Al-Taawoun FC)

Scotland

SPFL
Ianis Hagi(Rangers)

Slovakia

Fortuna Liga

Marius Alexe (Podbrezová) (on loan)

South Korea 
Cristian Dănălache (Daejeon Citizen)

Spain

La Liga
Florin Andone (Deportivo La Coruña)
Alin Toșca (Betis)
Gica Hagi( Real madrid )( Barcelona FC )

Liga Adelante
Răzvan Raț (Rayo Vallecano)
Paul Anton (Getafe)
Răzvan Ochiroșii (Alcorcón)

Segunda División
Dinu Moldovan (Ponferradina)
Răzvan Popa (Burgos)

Sweden

Superettan
Adrian Boroștean (Härnösands FF)
George Negruț (Härnösands FF)
Dacian Dacin (Bodens BK)

Turkey

Süper Lig
Bogdan Stancu (Bursaspor)
Raul Rusescu (Osmanlispor)
Iasmin Latovlevici (Karabükspor)
Cristian Tănase (Karabükspor)

Ukraine

Ukrainian Premier League
Alexandru Vlad (FC Dnipro Dnipropetrovsk)

Uzbekistan

Uzbek League
Bogdan Hauși (Buxoro FK)

Vietnam

V.League 1
Sabin-Cosmin Goia (Hoàng Anh Gia Lai F.C.)

Wales

Welsh Premier League
Mihai Leca (The New Saints)

References 

Romanian expatriate footballers
Association football player non-biographical articles